Laurențiu Marian Lis (born 8 September 2004) is a Romanian professional footballer who plays as a midfielder for Liga II side Metaloglobus București.

References

External links
 
 Laurențiu Lis at prosportbucuresti.ro

2004 births
Living people
Footballers from Bucharest
Romanian footballers
Association football midfielders
Liga I players
Liga II players
Liga III players
LPS HD Clinceni players
FC Metaloglobus București players